Kheir El-Din Obeid (born 20 November 1966) is a Syrian hurdler. He competed in the men's 110 metres hurdles at the 1992 Summer Olympics.

References

1966 births
Living people
Athletes (track and field) at the 1992 Summer Olympics
Syrian male hurdlers
Olympic athletes of Syria
Place of birth missing (living people)
20th-century Syrian people